Aldonça de Bellera (1370–1435), was a Spanish noble. 

She was married to Arnau Guillem de Bellera, and retired to her dower fief, the castle Rialp and its surrounding valleys and villages, when she was widowed in 1412. She is described as a good landlord with a peaceful and just rule over her domains. She is foremost known for the incident when her dower lands were attached and occupied by count Arnau Roger of IV Pallars in 1430. On 16 February, 1430, she was awoken and met with 50 armed soldiers outside. Her calm reaction was admired by her contemporaries. She hold the castle and organized the resistance while the domain outside was pillaged. She advised the peasantry to swear the allegiance to the invader, but report the attack to Maria of Castile, Queen of Aragon. By March, Pallars was forced to end his occupation of Rialp on royal command and return the rule of Rialp domain to her. She did not leave her fortress until her rights of her barony were guaranteed and Pallars were sentenced to compensate her and her peasantry.

Sources
 « Diccionari Biogràfic de Dones: Aldonça, de Bellera»
 Fuvià, Armand de (1989). Els primitius comtats i vescomtats de Catalunya. Barcelona: Enciclopedia Catalana.

1370 births
1435 deaths
15th-century Catalan people
15th-century Spanish women
Women in 15th-century warfare
Women in medieval European warfare